Chavez Glacier is a glacier about  long flowing south from Canisteo Peninsula into Cranton Bay. It was named by the Advisory Committee on Antarctic Names after Pat Chavez of the United States Geological Survey (USGS), Flagstaff, Arizona, co-leader of the USGS team that compiled the 1:5,000,000-scale Advanced Very High Resolution Radiometer maps of Antarctica in the 1990s.

See also
 List of glaciers in the Antarctic
 Glaciology

References 

 

Glaciers of Ellsworth Land